Softcat is a Marlow-based IT infrastructure provider founded by Peter Kelly in 1993. It has UK offices in Bristol, London, Manchester, Leeds, Marlow, Southampton, Birmingham and Glasgow, and an Irish office in Dublin.  The company is listed on the London Stock Exchange and it is a constituent of the FTSE 250 Index.

History

1993–2015: Softcat as a limited company 
Founded originally as Wardswift, Softcat was founded by Peter Kelly on 30 March 1993 in High Wycombe, under its original business name 'Software Catalogue'. In December 2005, Martin Hellawell became managing director (Later CEO) of the company. In April 2006, the company moved its headquarters to Marlow.

2015–present: Softcat as a public limited company 
The company was the subject of an initial public offering on the London Stock Exchange in November 2015. In March 2016, the company was promoted to the FTSE 250 Index. In March 2018, Hellawell stepped down as CEO and became chairman. On 1 April 2018, Hellawell was replaced by Graeme Watt as CEO.

In 2016, Softcat opened an office in Glasgow, Scotland making it the company's first office outside of England. In 2018, it announced that it would be opening an office in Dublin, Ireland making it the company's first office outside of the United Kingdom. In October 2019 Softcat opened its ninth office, in Birmingham.

Explain IT Podcast 

On 14 March 2018, Softcat launched a podcast, Explain IT. During its first season, Explain IT charted at Number 39 on the UK iTunes podcast chart. In December 2018, Softcat announced on its podcast feed that it would be launching a second season in January 2019. On 3 January 2019, Explain IT launched its second season. On 4 July 2019, Explain IT won the award for 'Best Marketing Campaign' at the 2019 CRN Sales and Marketing Awards.

Season 1

Season 2

References

External links
 Official website

Companies based in Buckinghamshire
Privately held companies of the United Kingdom
1993 establishments in the United Kingdom
Technology companies established in 1993
Companies listed on the London Stock Exchange